LMSI may refer to:

 Laser Magnetic Storage International, a defunct Philips subsidiary
 Lockheed Martin Systems Integration – Owego
 Latin Mass Society of Ireland
Lower Manhattan Security Initiative, a New York City Police Department initiative